.aero (derived from aeronautics) is a sponsored top-level domain (sTLD) used in the Domain Name System of the Internet.  It is the first sponsored top-level domain based on a single industrial theme. The aero domain is reserved for companies, organizations, associations, government agencies, and individuals in aerospace-related fields. It was created in 2002 and is operated by SITA.  SITA created and operates the Dot Aero Council.

Two-letter codes under .aero are reserved for airlines according to the IATA Airline Designators. While three-letter codes were initially reserved for airports (IATA airport code), they were released for registration by the larger aviation and aerospace community on December 1, 2008.

The aero top-level domain was initially approved in 2001 for a 5-year term expiring December 17, 2006 as part of a proof-of-concept of new top-level domains. The agreement was extended in October 2006 for a six-month term until June 17, 2007, and continued to be renewed on a June–December six-month cycle through June 17, 2009. In 2009, SITA and ICANN completed a new 10-year sponsorship agreement for the operation of aero.

References

External links
 IANA .aero WHOIS info
 Registry Operator website
 List of .aero accredited registrars
 Dot Aero Council
 SITA's proposal for renewal of its agreement with ICANN for .aero
 Public comments on the .aero renewal proposal
 Meet the .aero domain name registrars
 NamesBeyond .aero accredited registrar
 Secura .aero accredited registrar

Council of European National Top Level Domain Registries members
Sponsored top-level domains
Computer-related introductions in 2002

sv:Toppdomän#Generiska toppdomäner